Kröpelin is a town in the Rostock district, in Mecklenburg-Western Pomerania, Germany. It is situated 9 km southwest of Bad Doberan, and 23 km west of Rostock.

Kröpelin first appears in the written record in 1177 as Crapelin a settlement with Wendish origins. The town's name probably derives from the Slavic word crepelice meaning the place of quail. Kröpelin was granted Lubeck rights in 1249. Granted a town charter on 25 August 1250 by Heinrich Borwin III of Rostock it was known as a shoemakers' town based on the number of people who worked in that profession.

The town has experienced a number of devastating fires during its history, in 1377, 1560, 1580, 1738 and 1774.

The early nineteenth century  saw Jewish immigration into Kröpelin. The Jewish community built a cemetery outside the town in 1821. During the 1938 November pogrom it was desecrated by the Nazis and then fell until ruin. After the Second World War a memorial stone was erected to those members of the town's Jewish community who had died in the holocaust. In 2012, the cemetery was the subject to a number of anti-Semitic attacks, including criminal damage and racist graffiti.

References

External links
Official website (German)

Cities and towns in Mecklenburg
Populated places established in the 13th century
1240s establishments in the Holy Roman Empire
1249 establishments in Europe
Antisemitism in Germany
Holocaust locations in Germany